Aleksei Yuryevich Perminov (born 17 May 1968) is a former Russian professional footballer.

Club career
He made his professional debut in the Soviet Second League in 1986 for FC Manometr Tomsk.

References

1968 births
People from Kiselyovsk
Living people
Soviet footballers
Russian footballers
Association football defenders
FC Tom Tomsk players
FC Ural Yekaterinburg players
FC Rotor Volgograd players
FC Baltika Kaliningrad players
Russian Premier League players
Sportspeople from Kemerovo Oblast